Johanna Buick is a road cyclist from New Zealand. She represented her nation at the 2005 UCI Road World Championships.

References

External links
 profile at Procyclingstats.com

New Zealand female cyclists
Living people
Place of birth missing (living people)
Year of birth missing (living people)